Nordea Bank Lietuva was a Lithuanian branch of Nordea, the largest Nordic financial group. 

The Nordea Group entered the Lithuanian market in 2000. In 2004, it acquired the Polish bank Kredyt Bank S.A. Vilnius branch.

The Nordea branch in Lithuania operated as Nordea Bank Lietuva. The main office was located in Vilnius and other offices in Kaunas, Klaipėda, Panevėžys and Šiauliai. Altogether, Nordea Bank Lietuva employed 340 people.

On the basis of the Baltic operations of Nordea and DNB, Luminor Bank was created in August 2017. The merger was completed by 1 January 2019.

References

Banks of Lithuania
Banks established in 2000
Companies based in Vilnius
Lithuanian companies established in 2000